Mahesh Navami (Devanāgarī: महेश नवमी) is the biggest festival of the Maheshwari community. 
According to the Hindu calendar, every year, the Navami of the Shukla Paksha of the month of Jyeshtha is celebrated with the celebration of "Mahesh Navami". This festival is mainly dedicated to the worship of Lord Mahesha (God of Gods Mahadev) and the Goddess Parvati.

According to traditional belief, the lineage of the Maheshwari origin was done on Jyeshtha Shukla Navami of Yudhishtir Samvat 9, Since then, Maheshwari community has celebrated Jyeshtha Shukla Navami every year with the name of "Mahesh Navami" as the day of origin of the community. Religious and cultural events are performed on this day. This festival reveals complete devotion and faith to Lord Mahesha and Goddess Parvati.
It is the most important day in all this community people where several cultural events and rallies are arranged together to make unity and dignity amongst all. The main motto is to spread message of service, sacrifice, and righteousness. 

Hindu festivals